This is a list of flag bearers who have represented Bosnia and Herzegovina at the Olympics.

Flag bearers carry the national flag of their country at the opening ceremony of the Olympic Games.

See also
Bosnia and Herzegovina at the Olympics
List of flag bearers for Yugoslavia at the Olympics

References

Bosnia and Herzegovina at the Olympics
Bosnia and Herzegovina
Olympic